Devon Energy Corporation is an energy company engaged in hydrocarbon exploration in the United States. It is organized in Delaware and its corporate operative headquarters are in the 50-story Devon Energy Center in Oklahoma City, Oklahoma. Its primary operations are in the Barnett Shale STACK formation in Oklahoma, Delaware Basin, Eagle Ford Group, and the Rocky Mountains.

The company is ranked 520th on the Fortune 500. It is not on the Forbes Global 2000.

History
Devon was founded in 1971 by John Nichols and his son, J. Larry Nichols. In 1988, the company became a public company via an initial public offering. 
In August 2000, the company was added to the S&P 500. In 2004, Devon was one of several companies in the petroleum industry for which shareholder resolutions were introduced that would have required the companies to monitor their effects on climate change. In August 2008, co-founder John Nichols died.

In March 2010, the company sold assets in Brazil, Azerbaijan, and the Gulf of Mexico to BP for $7 billion. In October 2012, the company completed construction of its current headquarters, the 50-story Devon Energy Center in Oklahoma City, Oklahoma and closed its office in the Allen Center in Downtown Houston. In April 2014, the company sold its conventional assets in Canada to Canadian Natural Resources for C$3.125 billion. In June 2014, the company sold assets to Linn Energy for $2.3 billion.

In August 2015, Dave Hager was named president and chief executive officer of the company. In February 2016, Devon announced plans to lay off 1,000 employees, including 700 in Oklahoma City, and cut its dividend as part of a cost-cutting effort due to low prices of its products. In 2017, the company sold its Lavaca County assets in the Eagle Ford. In June 2019, the company sold its assets in Canada to Canadian Natural Resources for CAD $3.8 billion. In November 2019, the company almost capped a blowout at a natural gas well, which prompted authorities to seal off thousands of acres of land near the Eagle Ford Shale towns of Yorktown and Nordheim. Crews were able to install a capping stack on the well to reduce natural gas flowing from the well.

Acquisitions

Political activity
Devon contributed over $1 million in each of the last 3 U.S. election cycles, almost entirely to organizations and individuals affiliated with the Republican Party. In 2016, the company contributed $750,000 to the Senate Leadership Fund, whose goal is to protect the Republican majority in the United States Senate. It also gave $500,000 to the Congressional Leadership Fund, whose goal is to protect the Republican majority in the United States House of Representatives.

Devon and its lobbyists have been noted to have close ties to government officials. In 2014, an investigation by The New York Times uncovered that a three-page letter signed by Scott Pruitt, then the Attorney General of Oklahoma, to the United States Environmental Protection Agency advocating for a relaxing of laws related to hydraulic fracturing was actually written by lobbyists for Devon Energy and not by Pruitt.

In 2015, a shareholder resolution was introduced that would have required the company to disclose its lobbying activity against regulations to prevent climate change. The resolution received votes of support by approximately 20% of shareholders.

References

External links

 

1971 establishments in Oklahoma
Companies based in Oklahoma City
Companies listed on the New York Stock Exchange
Energy companies established in 1971
Natural gas companies of the United States
Non-renewable resource companies established in 1971
Oil companies of the United States
Petroleum in Oklahoma